The Fort Garry Hotel—officially the Fort Garry Hotel, Spa and Conference Centre—is an early-20th-century hotel in downtown Winnipeg, Manitoba, that opened for the first time on December 11, 1913. Built by the Grand Trunk Pacific Railway, it is one of Canada's grand railway hotels and the only surviving remnant from that era in Winnipeg.

It was designated as a National Historic Site of Canada in 1981, and as a Manitoba Provincial Heritage Site in 1990. A national heritage park connected to the hotel and to the remains of Upper Fort Garry was completed in 2017-2018.

History
The Fort Garry Hotel was built between 1911 and 1913 by the Grand Trunk Pacific Railway in order to service as a luxury accommodation for upper-class railway travellers. Constructed at a strategic location on Broadway, just one block from GTPR's Union Station, the hotel was one of many hotels built by Canadian railway companies in the early 20th century to encourage tourists to travel their transcontinental routes.

Initially, the new hotel was to be called "The Selkirk Hotel" after the Selkirk Settlers, but was instead named after Upper Fort Garry, which once stood at the junction of the Red and Assiniboine Rivers.

It was designed by Montreal architects George Ross and David MacFarlane, who modelled their original plans for the hotel after Ottawa's Château Laurier; plans originally called for a 10-storey structure, but two floors were added during construction. Like the Laurier and other Canadian railway hotels, The Fort Garry was constructed in the "château style" (also termed the "neo-château" or "châteauesque" style), making it Manitoba’s only example of this architectural style.

At the time of completion, the 13-storey hotel was the tallest structure in the city. The Fort Garry Hotel opened to the public at a grand ball on 10 December 1913, what the Manitoba Free Press called an "opening ball of great brilliancy."

The hotel's early prominence led it to have many famous guests, including Nelson Eddy, Harry Belafonte, Charles Laughton, Laurence Olivier, Liberace, Arthur Fiedler, Louis Armstrong, Gordie Howe, Lester Pearson, as well as King George VI and his wife Queen Elizabeth, who stayed during their 1939 royal tour of Canada.

The hotel was later owned by the Canadian National Railway after Grand Trunk was nationalized and absorbed into CN. In 1979, the hotel was purchased by the prominent John Draper Perrin family of Winnipeg, who operated it as an independent hotel until 1987.

In 1987, the hotel owed  in taxes and was in "urgent need of renovations to bring it up to modern-day standards." During this time, the hotel was briefly owned by the City of Winnipeg, before being acquired in early 1988 by a company controlled by Quebec hotelier Raymond Malenfant. The company purchased the hotel for $1 million with the promise of spending $12 million to renovate it. The hotel reopened in mid-1988 with a black-tie soiree of 750 guests.

In the 1990s, the hotel converted its two ballrooms into a provincial government-run casino, called the Crystal Casino. The casino only operated for approximately 10 years, as the hotel's owners urged the government to remove it.

In 2009, the hotel came under new ownership and was rebranded as the Fort Garry Hotel, Spa and Conference Centre.

In August 2020, The Fort Garry became part of Choice Hotels' Ascend Collection, under managing partners Richard Bel and Ida Albo, along with the Laberge Group out of Quebec City.

Folklore 
According to local folklore, the hotel (specifically room 202) is haunted by a female spirit. A woman apparently committed suicide in the room many years ago after hearing of the death of her husband in a car accident. Overcome with grief, she hanged herself in the closet.

CNR Radio 
The Fort Garry Hotel was the site of the Winnipeg studio of CNR Radio, the precursor to CBC Radio, between 1923 and 1932, using the original CKY transmitter on 665 kHz, moving to 780 kHz in 1925. CNR purchased time on stations they did not own, called "phantom" stations.

See also 
 Ida Albo, managing partner
Fort Garry

References

External links 
 Official Site
 Emporis Listing

Canadian National Railway hotels
Grand Trunk Pacific Railway hotels
Hotels in Manitoba
Hotels established in 1913
Hotel buildings completed in 1913
Buildings and structures in downtown Winnipeg
Châteauesque architecture in Canada
Ross and Macdonald buildings
National Historic Sites in Manitoba
Hotels on the National Historic Sites of Canada register
Municipal Historical Resources of Winnipeg
Reportedly haunted locations in Winnipeg
1913 establishments in Manitoba
Tourism in Winnipeg